Listen to Les was a long-running comedy sketch show on BBC Radio 2 starring Les Dawson.

Dawson performed various deadpan monologues and played in a number of recurring character sketches including "At Home with the Desponds", "The Sophisticates" and "Cissy and Ada" supported by other performers including Daphne Oxenford, Colin Edwynn and Roy Barraclough.

Every show ended with Dawson calling upon the studio audience to join him in a singalong with a popular or classic song, which he would deliberately play badly at the piano, to great comic effect.

BBC Radio comedy programmes